See You at the Pillar is a 1967 British short documentary film about Dublin combining contemporary footage, folk music and quotations from past residents such as George Bernard Shaw, Oscar Wilde and Brendan Behan. The film is narrated via a "conversation" between Anthony Quayle and Norman Rodway. Produced by Robert Fitchet, it was nominated for an Academy Award for Best Documentary Short.

References

External links

See You at the Pillar on YouTube, uploaded by British Pathé
See You at the Pillar at British Pathé

1967 films
British short documentary films
1960s short documentary films
1967 documentary films
Films set in Dublin (city)
Documentary films about cities
1960s English-language films
1960s British films